The 1939 Rice Owls football team was an American football team that represented Rice University as a member of the Southwest Conference (SWC) during the 1939 college football season. In its sixth season under head coach Jimmy Kitts, the team compiled a 1–9–1 record (0–5–1 against SWC opponents) and was outscored by a total of 143 to 77.

Schedule

References

Rice
Rice Owls football seasons
Rice Owls football